Eveline Slavici (born 7 December 1932 in Bucharest) is a Romanian former artistic gymnast. She competed at the 1952 Summer Olympics.

References

External links

1932 births
Living people
Romanian female artistic gymnasts
Gymnasts at the 1952 Summer Olympics
Olympic gymnasts of Romania
Gymnasts from Bucharest
20th-century Romanian women